Henry Pulaski Cherry (May 21, 1823July 17, 1895) was a Michigan politician.

Early life 
Cherry was born in New York on May 21, 1823.

Personal life 
Cherry had at least one child.

Career 
Cherry was elected to the Michigan House of Representatives on November 4, 1870. He served in this position 1871 to 1872.

Death 
Cherry died on July 17, 1895. He is interred at Bedford Cemetery in Battle Creek, Michigan.

References 

1823 births
1895 deaths
Republican Party members of the Michigan House of Representatives
Burials in Michigan
19th-century American politicians